Baron Newlands, of Newlands and Barrofield in the County of the City of Glasgow and of Mauldslie Castle in the County of Lanark, was a title in the Peerage of the United Kingdom. It was created on 19 January 1898 for the soldier Sir William Hozier, 1st Baronet. He had already been created a baronet in the Baronetage of the United Kingdom in 1890. He was succeeded by his only son, the second Baron. He represented Lanarkshire South in the House of Commons and served as Lord-Lieutenant of Lanarkshire. Lord Newlands was childless and the titles became extinct on his death on 5 September 1929.

Sir Henry Montague Hozier (1838–1907), younger brother of the first Baron, was a Colonel in the 3rd Dragoons and the father of Clementine Churchill, wife of Winston Churchill (although Clementine's paternity has been the subject of some debate).

Barons Newlands (1898)
William Wallace Hozier, 1st Baron Newlands (1825–1906)
James Henry Cecil Hozier, 2nd Baron Newlands (1851–1929)

Notes

References

Extinct baronies in the Peerage of the United Kingdom
Noble titles created in 1898